Karol Drzewiecki and Szymon Walków were the defending champions but only Walków chose to defend his title, partnering Łukasz Kubot. Walków lost in the semifinals to Julian Cash and Henry Patten.

Cash and Patten won the title after defeating Francesco Forti and Marcello Serafini 6–7(3–7), 6–4, [10–4] in the final.

Seeds

Draw

References

External links
 Main draw

Internazionali di Tennis Castel del Monte - Doubles
2022 Doubles